Karl Leonhard (21 March 1904 – 23 April 1988) was a German psychiatrist who was a student and collaborator of Karl Kleist, who himself stood in the tradition of Carl Wernicke. With Kleist, he created a complex classification of psychotic illnesses called Nosology. His work covered psychology, psychotherapy, biological psychiatry and biological psychology. Moreover, he created a classification of nonverbal communication.

Life
He was born at Edelsfeld in Bavaria as the sixth of eleven children, his father being a Protestant minister. His medical education (at Erlangen, Berlin and Munich) was completed in 1928 and he worked as a physician at psychiatric hospitals in Erlangen, then a year later Gabersee and from 1936 Frankfurt am Main, to which last he was called by Karl Kleist. During the period of the Third Reich in order to save his patients from being killed by means of the T-4 Euthanasia Program, he stopped making diagnoses that would endanger a patient.

He became a professor at Frankfurt in 1944 and a professor at Erfurt in the Soviet zone of Germany in 1954. In 1957 he became director of the psychiatric department at the Charité Hospital linked to the Humboldt University in East Berlin. He wanted to move back to West Germany in the 1960s, but was refused permission by the East German authorities. As compensation he got increased support for his scientific work. During his lifetime he interviewed more than 2000 psychotic patients, latterly with Dr Sieglinde von Trostorff. He died in East Berlin in 1988.

According to Helmut Beckmann (see "Books" below), editors of Western journals rejected his papers because "they were not in conformity with the standard practice of Anglo-American psychiatry and also because he pursued without compromise his own path derived from his findings." Most of his work was not translated into English. However summaries of Leonhard's views were included by Frank Fish in his "Schizophrenia" of 1962 (2nd edition 1976 ) and "Clinical Psychopathology" of 1967 (2nd edition 1985 ) which were widely read, if not understood, in their day.

Today diagnosis for psychotic patients and mentally or otherwise ill persons are most commonly placed by ICD or DSM criteria.
Psychosis will in general appear as an affective disorder (e.g. psychotic depression), a psychotic disorder (e.g. catatonic type of schizophrenia) or a mixture of both types, as evident in the schizoaffective disorder.

The Classification of Psychosis by Leonhard
Leonhard is well known for his classification of psychosis, based on the teamwork involving himself, his mentor Karl Kleist and fellow Kleist student Edda Neele. The classification is sometimes referred to as the Kleist-Leonhard classification system.

 Clinical Pictures of Phasic Psychoses (without Cycloid Psychoses)
 Manic-Depressive Illness
 Pure Melancholia and Pure Mania
 Pure Melancholia
 Pure Mania
 Pure Depressions and Pure Euphorias
 Pure Depressions
 Agitated Depression
 Hypochondriacal Depression
 Self-Tortured Depression
 Suspicious Depression
 Apathetic Depression
 Pure Euphorias
 Unproductive Euphoria
 Hypochondriacal Euphoria
 Exalted Euphoria
 Confabulatory Euphoria
 Indifferent Euphoria
 The Cycloid Psychosis
 Anxiety-Happiness Psychosis
 Excited-Inhibited Confusion Psychosis
 Hyperkinetic-Akinetic Motility Psychosis
 The Unsystematic Schizophrenias
 Affective Paraphrenia
 Cataphasia (Schizophasia)
 Periodic Catatonia
 The Systematic Schizophrenias
 Simple Systematic Schizophrenias
 Catatonic Forms
 Parakinetic Catatonia
 Manneristic Catatonia
 Proskinetic Catatonia
 Negativistic Catatonia
 Speech-Prompt Catatonia
 Sluggish Catatonia
 Hebephrenic Forms
 Foolish Hebephrenia
 Eccentric Hebephrenia
 Shallow Hebephrenia
 Autistic Hebephrenia
 Paranoid Forms
 Hypochondrical Paraphrenia
 Phonemic Paraphrenia
 Incoherrent Paraphrenia
 Fantastic Paraphrenia
 Confabulatory Paraphrenia
 Expansive Paraphrenia
 Combined Systematic Schizophrenias
 Combined Systematic Catatonias
 Combined Systematic Hebephrenias
 Combined Systematic Paraphrenias
 Early Childhood Schizophrenias

Books
 Die defektschizophrenen Krankheitsbilder, Leipzig: Thieme 1936
 Classification of Endogenous Psychoses and their Differentiated Etiology, 2nd edition edited by Helmut Beckmann. New York/Wien: Springer-Verlag 1999 
 Der menschliche Ausdruck in Mimik, Gestik und Phonik, Leipzig: Barth 1969 - 3 Aufl. Wuerzburg 1997.

Notes

References
 Internationale Wernicke-Kleist-Leonhard Gesellschaft
 Menschenkunde.de
 PsychiatrieOnline.org
 Julian Schwarz: Biography of Karl Leonhard in: Biographical Archive of Psychiatry (BIAPSY).

German psychiatrists
1904 births
1988 deaths
Bipolar disorder researchers
20th-century German physicians
Scientists from Frankfurt
Physicians of the Charité